Kabul Zwanan ( Kābəl Źwānān, literally "Kabul Youth") are a franchise cricket team which participates in the Afghanistan Premier League (APL). They joined the APL as one of its original members in 2018. Afghan leggie Rashid Khan was the captain for the inaugural session and Zimbabwean coach Heath Streak was appointed as the head coach of the team.

Current squad

The following players listed here are in present squad.

 Sohail Tanvir was not allowed by the board to participate in the first edition.

Administration and Supporting Staff
Head Coach:  Heath Streak

References

Afghan domestic cricket competitions
Cricket clubs established in 2018
2018 in Afghan cricket
Afghanistan Premier League teams